"Scared Money" is a song by American rapper YG, featuring fellow American rappers J. Cole and Moneybagg Yo. It was released through Def Jam Recordings and 4Hunnid Records as the lead single from YG's sixth studio album, I Got Issues, on February 4, 2022. The three artists wrote the song with producer Gibbo. The song was originally supposed to be released earlier, according to it being listed to impact urban contemporary radio on January 25, 2022. YG announced its release date and shared its cover art on February 2, 2022.

Composition and lyrics
Over the "menacing" piano-heavy instrumental of "Scared Money", YG, J. Cole, and Moneybagg Yo refer to the "scared money don't make no money" proverb. YG starts the song off with the first verse, in which he states compares his shoes to American rapper Kanye West's shoes and also declares himself as the "best dressed, but I ain't no Kid Cudi". Cole appears for the second verse, in which he refers to his "budding basketball career" and references the milk crate challenge ("I was thinkin' 'bout walkin' up a stack of crates/But I was busy stackin' cake"); he also compares himself to Canadian rapper and singer Drake and mentions the fact that he has three houses in the same neighborhood. Moneybagg Yo takes the third and final verse, in which he also boasts about his expensive purchases.

Critical reception
Jordan Darville of The Fader described the beat as "a close sibling" of American rapper Kendrick Lamar's 2017 single, "Humble", "from the beat's stalking piano keys to YG's more playful-than-usual flows", but "the key difference is that this one has features: J. Cole and Moneybagg Yo show up to do their things and help try and make the song feel like an event". Writing for Stereogum, Tom Breihan felt that "sometimes, big-name rap collaborations feel like brand extensions that were brought up in boardrooms" and "this one feels like three rap stars out to flex on everyone else", acknowledging that "I know this isn't the best verse of J. Cole's career, but it might be the one that I've enjoyed the most".

Charts

Weekly charts

Year-end charts

Certifications

References

2022 singles
2022 songs
YG (rapper) songs
J. Cole songs
Moneybagg Yo songs
Songs written by YG (rapper)
Songs written by J. Cole
Def Jam Recordings singles